William Ive (159731 August 1641) was an English politician who sat in the House of Commons in 1624.

Ive was of Leicestershire and matriculated at Lincoln College, Oxford on 26 April 1616, aged 18.

He was made Mayor of Leicester for 1615–16, 1625–6 and 1634–5. In 1624, he was elected Member of Parliament for Leicester in the Happy Parliament.

References

1597 births
1641 deaths
Alumni of Lincoln College, Oxford
English MPs 1624–1625
17th-century deaths
Mayors of places in Leicestershire